Carlo Marino (born 19 October 1968 in Caserta) is an Italian politician.

He joined the Democratic Party in 2007. He was elected Mayor of Caserta on 19 June 2016 and took office on 21 June.

See also
2016 Italian local elections
List of mayors of Caserta

References

External links
 
 

1968 births
Living people
Mayors of Caserta
Democratic Party (Italy) politicians